André Souvré (20 January 1939 – 15 December 2021) was a French basketball player. Notably, he was the father of Yannick Souvré. He appeared in eight games for the France national team. He died on 14 December 2021, at the age of 82.

References

1939 births
2021 deaths
France national basketball team players
French basketball players
Sportspeople from Orne